Carrer may refer to:

People with the surname:
Gustavo Carrer (1885-1968), Italian athlete in football
Pavlos Carrer (1829-1896) Greek music composer

In street names;
In Barcelona, Spain:
Carrer d'Aragó
Carrer d'Ausiàs Marc, Barcelona
Carrer de Balmes, Barcelona
Carrer de Bergara, Barcelona
Carrer del Carme, Barcelona
Carrer del Consell de Cent, Barcelona
Carrer d'Entença, Barcelona
Carrer de Pau Claris, Barcelona
Carrer de Pelai, Barcelona
Carrer de Roger de Llúria, Barcelona
Carrer de Tarragona, Barcelona
Carrer Gran de Gràcia, Barcelona
In Lleida, Spain:
Carrer de Lluís Companys, Lleida

See also

Carree (name)